The 1996 Major League Baseball All-Star Game was the 67th playing of the midsummer classic between the all-stars of the American League (AL) and National League (NL), the two leagues comprising Major League Baseball. The game was held on July 9, 1996, at Veterans Stadium in Philadelphia, the home of the Philadelphia Phillies of the National League. This marked the 15th and final All-Star Game appearance of Ozzie Smith, who retired after the 1996 season. Smith entered the game in the top of the sixth inning. His first at-bat was greeted by chants of "Oz-zie, Oz-zie" from the Philadelphia crowd. Iron Man Cal Ripken Jr., who was in the midst of his record-breaking run of consecutive games played, broke his nose during the pre-game AL team picture. However, he was ready to go at game time and started at SS.

During the pregame ceremonies, Kelsey Grammer of Frasier sang the American National Anthem and Canadian singer Sarah McLachlan sang the Canadian National Anthem.  U.S. Congressman Jim Bunning (who was elected to the baseball hall-of-fame in 1996) joined other Phillies' hall of fame alumni Mike Schmidt, Steve Carlton, Richie Ashburn and Robin Roberts in tossing the ceremonial first pitches.

Joe Carter, the Toronto Blue Jays representative to the All-Star Game, received boos from the crowd for his home run that ended the 1993 World Series.

The game resulted in the National League defeating the American League 6–0. The National League would not win another All-Star Game until 2010.

Then-Chairman of the Executive Committee Bud Selig presented the All-Star Game MVP Award to Mike Piazza.  Bobby Brown had presented the MVP Award in 1993, while National League President Len Coleman had presented the award in 1994 and 1995.  After presenting the MVP Award at the 1998 Major League Baseball All-Star Game, Selig was officially named Commissioner of Baseball.

This is the only All-Star Game in which not a single pitcher walked a batter; appropriately, Braves closer Mark Wohlers was the final pitcher of the game.

Veterans Stadium also held the "distinction" of being the most recent host stadium to be closed down, a distinction it lost after Yankee Stadium closed at the conclusion of the 2008 season. This is also, as of the end of the 2019 MLB season, the last MLB All-Star Game to be played on artificial turf (there are now five MLB stadiums with artificial turf, but all are of the next-generation variety).

Rosters
Players in italics have since been inducted into the National Baseball Hall of Fame.

American League

National League

Game

Umpires

Starting lineups

Game summary

References

External links
Baseball Almanac
Baseball-Reference

Major League Baseball All-Star Game
Baseball in Philadelphia
Sports competitions in Philadelphia
1990s in Philadelphia
Major League Baseball All-Star Game
Major League Baseball All Star Game
July 1996 sports events in the United States